Michael "Mike or Micah" Schwartz (מיכה שוורץ; born March 17, 1949) is an American-Israeli former basketball player and coach. He played the power forward position. He played and coached in the Israeli Basketball Premier League, and played for the Israel national basketball team

Biography
Schwartz is 1.94 m (6 ft 4 in) tall.

He played in the Israeli Basketball Premier League from 1967 to 1980 for Maccabi Tel Aviv and Upper Gallilee (which Schwartz later coached). Schwartz competed for the Israel national basketball team in the 1968 European Olympic Qualifying Tournament for Men, 1971 European Championship for Men, 1972 Pre-Olympic Basketball Tournament, and 1973 Universiade.

He lived in Haifa, Israel, early in his life, is married to Racheli Schwartz, and they live in Kibbutz Hulata, Israel. Schwartz's son Gal played basketball in the Israeli National League.

References 

Israeli men's basketball players
Maccabi Tel Aviv B.C. players
Israeli basketball coaches
Israeli Basketball Premier League players
People from Haifa
Kibbutzniks
Basketball players at the 1970 Asian Games
Medalists at the 1970 Asian Games
Asian Games medalists in basketball
Asian Games silver medalists for Israel
1949 births
Living people